was a town located in Date District, Fukushima Prefecture, Japan.

As of 2003, the town had an estimated population of 6,592 and a density of 309.34 persons per km2. The total area was 21.31 km2.

On July 1, 2008, Iino was merged into the expanded city of Fukushima.

Iino is famous for UFOs. Japan's first-ever "UFO lab" for study and observation was opened here in 2020. The UFO Fureaikan museum is also located nearby, close to Senganmori mountain.

References

External links
 City of Fukushima official website 
 Iino International UFO Lab official website 
 Iino UFO Fureaikan museum official website 

Dissolved municipalities of Fukushima Prefecture
Populated places disestablished in 2008
2008 disestablishments in Japan
Fukushima (city)